The South Western Railway, also known as the South West Main Line, is the main railway route between Perth and Bunbury in Western Australia.

History

Construction
The South Western Railway was constructed for the Western Australian Government Railways (WAGR) by various private contractors from 1891. Among these was the engineer and magistrate William W. L. Owen.

Construction was completed in two parts. The first, East Perth to Pinjarra, was undertaken by William Atkins (former mill manager of the Neil McNeil Co. at the Jarrahdale Timber Station) and Robert Oswald Law (who built the Fremantle Long Jetty) from the end of 1891. Work began in 1892 but was slowed by difficulties with building the bridge over the Swan River. This section opened on 22 May 1893.

The second phase of construction was also completed by Atkins and McNeil, starting at Bunbury and working north to Pinjarra opening on 22 August 1893. Bunbury station was opened by Sir John Forrest on 14 November 1894.

Alignment
Since that time, the line has been shortened to 181 km as some stations have closed, moved or been replaced by passing loops.

This section is double-tracked and electrified using 25 kV AC. The section from Perth to Mundijong Junction is controlled by the Public Transport Authority, with the remainder of the line controlled by Arc Infrastructure. 

The section controlled by Arc Infrastructure has been upgraded to accommodate 21 tonne axle loads, featuring concrete sleepers and continuous welded 50 kg/m rail.

Bridges
The Bunbury Bridge near Perth was the most significant engineering structure on the line. It was replaced by the Goongoongup Bridge in 1996. Other notable bridges include:

Branches

The line connects with all Transperth commuter rail lines at Perth, with specific branches to the Midland Line at Claisebrook and the Thornlie Line at Kenwick.

In terms of key freight connectivity, the line branches to the Kwinana Line at Kenwick and Mundijong Junction. The Jarrahdale Branch was accessed at Mundijong, but this line is now out of service. A branch south of Pinjarra serves Alcoa and provides access to the Hotham Valley Branch. The Collie Branch connects at Brunswick Junction, providing access to Worsley Alumina and Collie. At Picton the line once continued a 200 km south as the Northcliffe Branch, with further branches to Flinders Bay and Katanning, however only the first few kilometres of this line remain in use. A 10 km spur to Bunbury Harbour provides access to the port west of Picton.

Timber tramways

Several timber mills used to operate along the railway, each with their own access to the mainline. Many of these mills operated extensive timber tramways that fed significant quantities of timber to the railway.

Operations

Passenger
The Transperth commuter rail Armadale Line operates a frequent passenger service at the Perth end of the route.

Beyond Armadale the only passenger service on the line is The Australind. It traverses the entire length of the line from Perth to Bunbury twice a day in each direction, taking about 2 hours and 30 minutes each way. Other named trains that previously operated on the line were the Bunbury Belle and The Shopper.

Stations
There are currently 31 passenger stations on the line, of which 20 are served by Armadale Line services. Beyond the Armadale Line section, all stations meet Disability Discrimination Act standards. The stations at Brunswick Junction and Bunbury provide connections to Transwa coach services.

Freight

Freight services on the line are operated by Aurizon and are primarily focused on bauxite and alumina mining and refining. Bulk bauxite is carried from Alcoa Pinjarra to Kwinana for export and bulk alumina is transported from Alcoa Wagerup as well as from Worsley Alumina to Bunbury port. Caustic soda is transported from Bunbury Port to Wagerup and Worsley for use in alumina refining and some coal from the Collie Branch is also carried on the line. Potential exists for the line to carry mineral sands, agricultural produce, lithium ore and containerised freight on the line in the future.

References

Further reading

 
 

 
Railway lines in Western Australia
Railway lines opened in 1894